The 2003 Pan American Women's Handball Championship was the seventh edition of the Pan American Women's Handball Championship, held in Brazil from 29 April to 4 May 2003. It acted as the American qualifying tournament for the 2003 World Women's Handball Championship.

Preliminary round
All times are local (UTC−3).

Group A

Group B

Knockout stage

Bracket

Semifinals

Seventh place game

Fifth place game

Third place game

Final

Final ranking

External links
Results on todor66.com

2003 Women
American Women's Handball Championship
Pan
2003 in Brazilian women's sport
April 2003 sports events in South America
May 2003 sports events in South America